Citrus limetta, alternatively considered to be a cultivar of Citrus limon, C. limon 'Limetta', is a species of citrus, commonly known as mousami, musami, sweet lime, sweet lemon, and sweet limetta, it is a member of the sweet lemons. It is small and round like a common lime in shape. It is a cross between the citron (Citrus medica) and a bitter orange (Citrus × aurantium).

It is native to southern regions of Iran and also cultivated in the Mediterranean Basin.

 In Iran it is called limu shirin (meaning 'sweet lemon' in Persian). Its juice is widely used throughout Iran in the fall and winter as a remedy for colds and flu.
 In India, it is commonly called mausambi, mosambi, or musambi in Hindi ( or ), musammi (ਮੁਸੰਮੀ) in Punjabi, mosambi (मोसंबी) in Marathi, moushumi or mushumbi lebu (মৌসুমী বা মুসুম্বি লেবু) in Bengali, satukudi or satukodi in Tamil, musambi in Kannada, battayi in Telugu, chinikaya in Rayalaseema, and musambi in Malayalam.
 In Bangladesh, it is called musambi or mosambi (in Bengali).
 In Nepali, it is called mausam.
 In Pakistan, usually, it is called musami (in Urdu and Punjabi).
 In the Sindh, it is known as mosami.
 Among Iraqi Armenians, it is called noumi.
 In France, it is sometimes called bergamot; it should not be confused with Citrus bergamia, the bergamot orange.
 In the Dominican Republic, it is called limón dulce, lima dulce, dulce limeta, or limettioides dulces, because of this sweetness in these two citrus fruits.

It is a different fruit from the Palestinian sweet lime and from familiar sour limes such as the Key lime and the Persian lime. However, genomic analysis revealed it to be highly similar to the Rhobs el Arsa, and the two likely represent progeny of distinct crosses of the same citrus parents.

The South Asian cultivars originated in Mozambique and were brought to South Asia by the Portuguese. The common name musambi and its variants trace their origin to Mozambique.

Description 

Fruits are oval and green, ripening to yellow, with greenish pulp. Despite the name sweet lime, the fruit is more similar to a greenish orange in appearance.

C. limetta grows in tropical and subtropical climates. It begins bearing fruit at 5 to 7 years old, with peak production at 10 to 20 years. It is propagated by seed.

Flavour 

As the name sweet lime suggests, the flavour is sweet and mild, but retains the essence of lime. The lime's taste changes rapidly in contact with air, and will turn bitter in few minutes, but if drunk soon after being juiced, the taste is sweet. The flavour is a bit flatter than most citrus due to its lack of acidity. It can be compared to limeade and pomelo.

Uses 
Sweet lime is served as juice and is good as a mixer for vodka or rum. It is the most common available citrus juice in the Indian subcontinent. The juice is commonly sold at mobile road stalls.

Like most citrus, the fruit is rich in vitamin C, providing 50 mg per 100 g serving and antioxidants. In Iran it is popular as a house remedy to treat influenza and the common cold.

The tree is used for ornamental purposes as well as for graft stock.

Checking for ripeness 
Like most citrus, sweet limes will not ripen off the tree, and must be picked when fully ripe. This is indicated by its tennis ball size and lustrous greenish yellow sheen. Gently scratch the surface of a sweet lime: If its oils give way in the fingernails, it is ripe. The juiciest fruits feel heavy for their size.

Underripe fruit feels light for its size, and is hard with tart flesh. Overripe fruit is dull and shrunken, with dry, spongy skin. Avoid fruit with brownish-yellow discoloration.

Storage 
Sweet limes keep fresh for up to two weeks at room temperature, and four to eight weeks refrigerated. Frozen juice will keep for up to six months. It is possible to freeze slices of the fruit, though the limonin content may cause the pulp to taste bitter over time. This can be avoided by submerging the slices in sweet syrup within an airtight glass jar.

References 

Agriculture in Pakistan
Agriculture in India
limetta